The Community Building, originally built as the Rowan County Courthouse, is a historic building located at Salisbury, Rowan County, North Carolina.  It was built between 1854 and 1857, and is a two-story, Classical Revival, stuccoed brick building on a granite foundation.  It measures 50 feet wide and 85 feet long and features a pedimented portico supported by six Doric order columns.  The portico includes a cast iron balcony and the building is distinguished by tall windows.  A new Rowan County Courthouse was built in 1914, and the building used as a community center. The building is operated by the Rowan Museum.

It was listed on the National Register of Historic Places in 1970. It is located in the Salisbury Historic District.

References

External links

Rowan Museum website

Historic American Buildings Survey in North Carolina
County courthouses in North Carolina
Courthouses on the National Register of Historic Places in North Carolina
Government buildings completed in 1857
Museums in Rowan County, North Carolina
National Register of Historic Places in Rowan County, North Carolina
Individually listed contributing properties to historic districts on the National Register in North Carolina
1857 establishments in North Carolina